Mali Morris  (born 5 February 1945) is a British artist. She was born in north Wales, and studied at Newcastle University and the University of Reading.
 
In 1970 she became a lecturer in extramural studies at Sunderland College of Art.  1980 Morris was invited by the artist Stass Paraskos to be an artist-in-residence at the Cyprus College of Art in the village of Lempa on the island of Cyprus. Morris was elected as a Royal Academician in 2010.

References

External links
 Official website
 

1945 births
Living people
20th-century Welsh women artists
21st-century Welsh women artists
Alumni of Newcastle University
Alumni of the University of Reading
Royal Academicians
Welsh women painters